Melwood is an unincorporated community and census-designated place (CDP) in Prince George's County, Maryland, United States. It was newly delineated for the 2010 census, at which time its population was 3,051. Per the 2020 census, the population was 3,977.

Geography
The CDP is located directly to the east of Andrews Air Force Base.

Demographics

2020 census

Note: the US Census treats Hispanic/Latino as an ethnic category. This table excludes Latinos from the racial categories and assigns them to a separate category. Hispanics/Latinos can be of any race.

Education
Melwood residents are assigned to schools in Prince George's County Public Schools. The zoned schools are Melwood Elementary School, James Madison Middle School, and Dr. Henry A. Wise Jr. High School.

See also
Melwood Park, historic house located just outside Melwood

References

Census-designated places in Maryland
Census-designated places in Prince George's County, Maryland